The 2019 COSAFA U-20 Cup was the 26th edition of the COSAFA U-20 Challenge Cup, an international youth competition open to national associations of the COSAFA region. It took place between 4 December and 14 December in Zambia.

The competition was open to players born on or before 1 January 2000.

Participants

Match officials

Referees
 Mohamed Athoumani (Comoros) 
 Patrice Milazar (Mauritius) 
 (Ms) Rosaly Rosalie (Madagascar)  
 Retselisitsoe David Molise (Lesotho) 
 Gift Chicco (Malawi) 
 Mathews M. Hamalila (Zambia)
 Yvon Havelock (Seychelles) 
 Njabulo Thembinkosi Dlamini (Swaziland) 
 Keabetswe Dintwa (Botswana)  

Assistant Referees
 Evanildo Gaspar Martins (Angola) 
 Zacarias Baloi (Mozambique) 
 (Ms) Stellah Ruvinga (Zimbabwe)  
 Brighton Nyika (Zimbabwe)
 Elphas Sitole South Africa)
 Chiwoyu Sinyangwe  (Zambia)
 Alex Muzibwane Lumponjani (Namibia) 
 Dimbiniaina Andriatianarivelo (Madagascar) 
 (Ms) Harilalaina Razafitsalama (Madagascar)

Venues

Groups

Group A

Group B

Group C

Knockout stage

Semifinals

Third-Place

Final

Winners

References

U-20
2019
2019 in Zambian sport
International association football competitions hosted by Zambia
December 2019 sports events in Africa